Ağikan is a village in the Adıyaman District, Adıyaman Province, Turkey. The village is populated by Kurds of the Kawan tribe and had a population of 116 in 2021.

References 

Villages in Adıyaman District
Kurdish settlements in Adıyaman Province